Darragh Burns (born 6 August 2002) is an Irish professional footballer who plays as a winger for EFL League One club Milton Keynes Dons.

Club career

Youth career
Raised in Stamullen, County Meath, Burns began playing at top Dublin academy St Kevin's Boys, a club renowned for producing several Republic of Ireland senior internationals. In April 2017, while at Under-15 level, he scored the winning goal in the Final of the Ravenna European Cup played in Ravenna, Italy. During the tournament his side won all eight games against clubs from all over Europe to win the tournament, with Burns also having scored several goals en route to the final.

In 2018, Burns signed for St Patrick's Athletic, where he initially represented the club's Under-17 side. On 30 October 2019, Burns was part of the side that won the League of Ireland U17 Division, setting up the opening goal for Ben McCormack as his side defeated Bohemians 4–0 in the final at Richmond Park. On 22 December 2020, in his final game at underage level, Burns scored the winning goal in the League of Ireland U19 Division Final, scoring a 120th minute penalty to beat Bohemians 2–1 after extra time at the UCD Bowl to secure a UEFA Youth League spot for the club.

St Patrick's Athletic

2019 season
Burns made his debut in senior football on 13 July 2019 aged 16, coming off the bench in a friendly against reigning UEFA Europa League champions Chelsea in the 59th minute. His first involvement in the game was to nutmeg France international Tiémoué Bakayoko before drawing a foul and a booking from Denmark international Andreas Christensen. Burns' first involvement with the first team in a competitive game came on 16 August 2019 when he was an unused substitute in a 2–1 win over Sligo Rovers in the league. His competitive debut in senior football on 15 September 2021, replacing Chris Forrester in the 62nd minute of a 1–0 win away to Cabinteely in the Leinster Senior Cup Quarter Final at Stradbrook Road. His first start came on 2 November in the Semi Final of the same competition, a 3–1 win away to Sheriff YC after extra time. Two weeks later Burns missed the 4–0 win over Athlone Town in the Final as he was on international duty but the win went down as his first medal at senior level.

2020 season
On 23 January 2020, Burns signed a 2 year deal with St Patrick's Athletic, his first professional contract. Ahead of the season Burns' received the number 35 as his first squad number. On 3 August 2020, he made his League of Ireland Premier Division debut, replacing Jordan Gibson from the bench in the 75th minute of a 2–0 loss at home to Derry City. He made a total of 6 appearances over the season, all from the bench as his side missed out on a European place on the final day of the season.

2021 season
Burns changed to the number 17 shirt ahead of the 2021 season. His first goal in senior football came on 9 April 2021, when he scored the second goal to help secure a 2–0 home win over Derry City for his side. On 20 April, he scored the only goal of the game in the second minute to beat Waterford at Richmond Park. It was announced on 6 July 2021 that Burns had signed a contract extension with the club. He scored the winning goal in a 3–2 win over Longford Town on 3 September 2021, curly his shot into the top corner in the 87th minute before Longford got a late consolation goal. Burns scored two goals in a 3–0 win over Wexford in the FAI Cup Quarter Final on 17 September 2021. 
Burns produced a Man of the Match display in a 3–1 win over Dundalk FAI Cup Semi Final, setting up Matty Smith's goal to put Pat's infront before dinking Peter Cherrie in goals in the 86th minute to secure a place in the 2021 FAI Cup Final at the Aviva Stadium. On 12 November 2021, his headed equaliser in his side's 2–2 draw at home to Finn Harps secured a 2nd place finish for the club, their best since their 2013 league win, to secure UEFA Europa Conference League football for the following season. After the game, he was awarded both the club's Young Player of the Year Award and the Goal of the Season Award for 2021, as voted by their supporters. On 28 November 2021 Burns played the full 120 minutes in the 2021 FAI Cup Final, beating rivals Bohemians 4–3 on penalties following a 1–1 draw after extra time in front of a record FAI Cup Final crowd of 37,126 at the Aviva Stadium.

2022 season
Burns was subject to interest from Scottish Premiership sides Hibernian and Celtic during the January transfer window, with Pat's rejecting a bid from Hibs due to it not reaching their valuation for Burns. On 11 February 2022, Burns was in the starting XI for the 2022 President of Ireland's Cup against Shamrock Rovers at Tallaght Stadium, as his side lost 5–4 on penalties after a 1–1 draw. On 18 February 2022, Burns scored his side's first goal in a 3–0 win over rivals Shelbourne at Tolka Park, curling a 25 yard effort into the top corner to help his side to an opening game of the season victory. On 1 April 2022, he scored a 77th minute equaliser to earn a point for his side in a 1–1 draw with Drogheda United at Richmond Park. On 6 May, Burns opened the scoring in a 4–0 win away to Drogheda United with a looping header from a Billy King cross flying into the top corner after 4 minutes, while he also assisted Kyle Robinson's first league goal for the club in the same game. On 14 May, he earned his side a point when he scored the equaliser in a 1–1 draw away to Sligo Rovers at The Showgrounds.

Milton Keynes Dons

2022–23 season
On 4 July 2022, Burns signed for EFL League One club Milton Keynes Dons on a permanent deal for a fee in the region of €180,000. His first goals for the club came on 15 July 2022 when he scored a brace and assisted another goal in a 6–0 friendly win over Norwich City. Burns made his league debut on 30 July 2022 as an 82nd-minute substitute in a 1–0 defeat away to Cambridge United. On 23 August 2022, Burns scored his first competitive goal for the club in a 2–0 EFL Cup second round away win over Watford, after also assisting the opening goal of the game for Matthew Dennis.

International career

Northern Ireland
Born in Dublin, Burns was eligible to represent both Republic of Ireland as well as Northern Ireland at international level, whom he qualified to play for through his Belfast born father. Burns initially represented Northern Ireland U17 following unsuccessful requests to the FAI from his coaches at St Patrick's Athletic to call him up for the Republic of Ireland. His form with Northern Ireland led to an international callup from the Republic of Ireland U17 team who he made his debut for in a 1–1 draw with Turkey U17 in a friendly at Tallaght Stadium on 18 September 2018. 2 days later he scored against the same opposition in a 4–1 win. After not being called up by the Republic of Ireland for their next squad, Burns returned to Northern Ireland and scored his first goals for the country on 30 October 2018 by scoring 2 penalties in a 6–0 win away to San Marino. In November 2019 he scored the winning penalty for Northern Ireland U19 against Northern Ireland U19 in a preparation tournament for the UEFA European Under-19 Championship. Following Burns being capped by Northern Ireland in a competitive game it left him with only one change of international allegiance left with FIFA.

Republic of Ireland
In October 2021, Burns revealed he regularly attended the Aviva Stadium as a Republic of Ireland fan and Republic of Ireland U21 manager Jim Crawford revealed that Burns was in the process of changing his international allegiance to the country of his birth, stating "Darragh is keen to play, which is great news for myself and it's in the hands of legal at the minute. That's just standard procedure to get everything over the line, to change an association, and it can be a long process. He's done fantastic with Pat's. The sooner it happens the better. He's somebody that can go again for the next campaign. He's an exciting player to bring in, that's for sure." On 11 March 2022, it was announced that Burns had been called up to the Republic of Ireland U20 squad following the completion of his international allegiance change with FIFA. He made his return to a Republic of Ireland team on 22 March 2022 playing in a friendly against the Republic of Ireland Amateur side at Whitehall Stadium. The following day, he was added to the Republic of Ireland U21 squad for the first time, ahead of their 2023 UEFA European Under-21 Championship qualification match away to Sweden U21.

Career statistics

Honours
St Patrick's Athletic
FAI Cup: 2021
Leinster Senior Cup: 2018–19

Individual
St Patrick's Athletic Young Player of the Year: 2021
St Patrick's Athletic Goal of the Season: 2021

References

External links

2002 births
Living people
People from County Meath
Association football midfielders
St Patrick's Athletic F.C. players
Milton Keynes Dons F.C. players
League of Ireland players
Association footballers from County Meath
English Football League players
Republic of Ireland association footballers
Republic of Ireland youth international footballers
Northern Ireland youth international footballers